Daphnia galeata is a small species of planktonic crustaceans. It lives in freshwater environments across a large area of the Northern Hemisphere, mostly in lakes.

D. galeata comprises two subspecies: D. g. galeata, found in the Old World, and D. g. mendotae, named after Lake Mendota near Madison, Wisconsin, in the New World. D. g. mendotae may be a homoploid hybrid taxon. In the lower Great Lakes, the populations are mostly hybrids of the European and American subspecies.

References

Cladocera
Freshwater crustaceans
Crustaceans described in 1864